Karl Grossman is an author, TV program host and full professor of journalism at the State University of New York/College at Old Westbury. For 30 years, he has hosted the TV interview program Enviro Close-Up with Karl Grossman. He is the author of six books.

Grossman attended Antioch College in Yellow Springs, Ohio, Adelphi-Suffolk College in Sayville, N.Y. and received a bachelor's degree with a social science concentration from Empire State College of the State University of New York. He is also the recipient of a master's degree in media studies from The New School for Social Research in New York City.

Bibliography

Books
Cover Up: What You Are Not Supposed to Know About Nuclear Power (1980)
The Poison Conspiracy (1982)
Nicaragua: America's New Vietnam? (1984)
Power Crazy:Is LILCO Turning Shoreham Into America's Chernobyl? (1986)
The Wrong Stuff: The Space Program's Nuclear Threat to Our Planet (1997)
Weapons in Space  (2001)

References

External links
 Official website
 http://www.envirovideo.com

1942 births
Living people
American male journalists
Antioch College alumni
State University of New York at Old Westbury faculty
American anti–nuclear power activists
Empire State College alumni
Adelphi University alumni
Place of birth missing (living people)